Robert Pearson "Bert" Harkins (born 15 April 1940) is a Scottish former motorcycle speedway rider.

Biography
His father a fireman, he was born in the Govan Fire Station in 1940. Harkins was initially a star of cycle speedway who represented Scotland and reached two World Finals. He competed on motorcycles in road racing and first rode a speedway bike in 1961. While working as a lawnmower mechanic for the Glasgow Parks Department he began his speedway career in the early 1960s, and represented Scotland against England in 1964, going on to represent Scotland several times both at home and around the world until 1973.

He began his career with Edinburgh Monarchs in 1963, riding for the team until 1969, after they had relocated to Coatbridge. In 1968 he travelled to Australia where he won the Victorian Individual Speedway Championship.

In 1970 he signed for Wembley Lions where he spent two seasons, captaining the team after Ove Fundin retired, before moving on to Sheffield Tigers and then Wimbledon Dons, where he rode for three seasons before trying his luck in the United States in 1976 with the Bakersfield Bandits. In 1977 he returned to British League action with Edinburgh, staying until the end of the 1979 season. His final season in British speedway was 1980, riding for Milton Keynes Knights.

Harkins was a reserve in the 1971 British final, scoring two points. He finished fifth (with Jim McMillan) in the 1970 World Pairs Final.

A familiar figure in his glasses and tartan hat, Harkins was nicknamed 'Haggis' and also 'Bertola' (after a brand of Sherry sold in Scotland). Harkins was also known to take his pre-meeting parade lap (on his bike) while wearing his tartan hat and kilt.

In 1977, Harkins won the Scottish Open Championship in Blantyre.

After speedway he concentrated on his motorcycle spares and accessories business, Bert Harkins Racing, and later managed the Scottish national team. In 2008 he became President of the World Speedway Riders Association, taking over the position from Ivan Mauger.

He has his own page on Facebook.

World Final appearances

World Pairs Championship
 1970 -  Malmö, Malmö Stadion (with Jim McMillan) - 4th - 18pts (8)

References

External links
Bert Harkins Racing
 https://www.worldspeedwayriders.org/rider/50/bert-harkins 
 https://www.facebook.com/bert.harkins

1940 births
Living people
British speedway riders
Scottish speedway riders
Scottish motorcycle racers
Edinburgh Monarchs riders
Wembley Lions riders
Sheffield Tigers riders
Wimbledon Dons riders
Milton Keynes Knights riders
Wolverhampton Wolves riders